Java is an island of Indonesia.

Java may also refer to:

Computing
 Java (programming language), an object-oriented high-level programming language
 Java (software platform), software and specifications developed by Sun, acquired by Oracle
 Java virtual machine, an abstract computing machine enabling a computer to run a Java program

Food and drink
 Java (drink), American slang term for coffee
 Java chicken, a breed of chicken originating in the United States
 Java coffee, a variety of coffee grown on the island of Java

Geography

United States
 Java, Alabama
 Java, Montana
 Java, New York
 Java, Ohio
 Java, South Dakota
 Java, Virginia

Other places
 Java, Mull, a hamlet on the Isle of Mull, Argyll and Bute, Scotland
 Java-eiland, a neighborhood in Amsterdam
 Java (town), a town in Georgia/South Ossetia
 Java District, district around this town in Georgia
 Java, São Tomé and Príncipe 
 Jave la Grande or Java Maior, a phantom island south of Java.

Entertainment
 Java (board game), a board game set on the island of Java
 Java (comics), a villain appearing in the DC Comics series Metamorpho
 Java the Caveman, one of the main characters in the French-Canadian animated series Martin Mystery

Music and dance
 Java (dance), a Parisian Bal-musette dance
 Java (band), a French band
 "Java" (instrumental), a 1958 song by Allen Toussaint
 "Java", song by Lucienne Delyle, Grand Prix du disque 1956  Eddy Marnay & Emil Stern 
 "Java", a song by Augustus Pablo
 "Java Jive", a song by The Ink Spots

Transportation
 Avian Java, a British hang glider
 HMS Java, three ships of the British Royal Navy
 Java (1813 ship), British merchant and migrant ship
 USS Java (1815), a 44-gun frigate in the United States Navy
 SS Java (1865), a British and French ocean liner built in 1865
 Java-class cruiser, a class of Dutch World War II light cruisers
 Bentley Java, a 1994 concept car
 Chrysler Java, a 1999 concept car

Other uses
 Javanese script (ISO 15924 code: Java)
 Java (cigarette), a brand of Russian cigarettes

See also
 Java Man, one of the first specimens of Homo erectus to be discovered
 JavaScript, an interpreted programming language
 Javan (disambiguation)
 Javanese (disambiguation)
 Jawa (disambiguation)
 Jaffa (disambiguation)